ʿEin as-Sulṭān , or ʿEin Sultan Camp, is a Palestinian village and refugee camp in the Jericho Governorate of the State of Palestine, in the Jordan Valley, in the eastern West Bank. The village is located adjacent to the archaeological site of Tell es-Sultan, 1 kilometer north-west of the city of Jericho.    

ʿEin as-Sulṭān had a population of over 1,469 inhabitants in mid-year 2006. In 1997, refugees constituted 81% of the population.

History
The first permanent settlement built near ancient Jericho was at Tell es-Sultan, by the Ein es-Sultan spring, between 8000 and 7000 BC, and consisted of a number of walls, a religious shrine, and a 23-foot (7.0 m) tower with an internal staircase. After a few centuries, it was abandoned for a second settlement established in 6800 BC close by.

To Jews and Christians, the Ein es-Sultan spring is known as the "Spring of Elisha", after its supposed purification by the prophet Elisha. The Byzantines built a domed church nearby dedicated to Saint Eliseus (Elisha in Greek).

The Crusaders improved the water mills at Ein es-Sultan to crush sugar cane in tawahin es-sukkar (sugar mills) and exported the sugar to Jerusalem. The Crusaders are credited with introducing sugarcane production to the city.

ʿEin as-Sulṭān camp was established in 1948, on 870 dunums of arid land below the Mount of Temptation. Just before the 1967 Arab-Israeli conflict, the camp had accommodated some 20,000 refugees. During the hostilities the majority of the refugees fled across the Jordan River to Jordan.
On 13 November 1985, following an agreement with UNRWA, the Israeli authorities began a program of demolishing unused houses. At the time the camp’s population was 600. In 1987 the authorities tried to expel as many of the refugees as they could. The US reports state that the refugees were suffering from "deteriorating economic circumstances".

Today, ʿEin Sulṭān has a small population of only 1,732 registered refugees. Some non-refugees have moved onto the camp's lands and built illegal homes as there is over-crowding and Israel authorities controls the issuing of building permits.

Water
Water scarcity is a major problem in this arid area, especially during the summer. The springs Ein as-Sultan, Ayn al-Nuway'mia and Ayn al Duyuk were utilised during the Roman occupation for irrigation to cultivate the land. After 1975 the water from the spring Ein as-Sultan was collected in four small basins. UNRWA supplies Ein Sultan with water by pumping it from a nearby spring. The out fall of the spring is close to Tell el-Sultan, the site of ancient Jericho. During the summer months, water shortages in the camp cause tremendous hardship for the refugees. However, the Israeli water company Mekorot has become the main supplier of water to the camp after Israel took control of water sources.

Following the signing of the 1994 Gaza–Jericho Agreement and Israeli army redeployment, the camp came under the control of the Palestinian National Authority.

In 2002, two stories were added to Ein Sultan School, including a new library, a multi-purpose room, an additional three classrooms and a computer lab.

Notable people
 Nasr Abdel Aziz Eleyan

References

External links
 Ein el-Sultan, articles from UNWRA
 'Ein as Sultan Camp (Fact Sheet), Applied Research Institute–Jerusalem, ARIJ
 'Ein as Sultan Camp Profile, ARIJ
 'Ein as Sultan aerial photo, ARIJ
 Locality Development Priorities and Needs in 'Ein as Sultan Camp, ARIJ

Jericho Governorate
Populated places established in 1948
Palestinian refugee camps in the West Bank